mESAdb is a database for the analysis of sequences and expression of microRNA

See also
 MiRTarBase
 microRNA

References

External links
 http://konulab.fen.bilkent.edu.tr/mirna/

Biological databases
RNA
MicroRNA